The Zoryan Institute is a non-profit organization and registered charity in the United States and Canada that promotes the study and recognition of the Armenian genocide as well as other genocides throughout history. Historian Dominik J. Schaller states that while "its scientific and pedagogic activities to be of great value", the institute also functions as "an influential actor in memory politics".

History
In the late 1970s, a small group of Armenians, absorbed with questions about their history, their identity, and their future as a nation, came to the conclusion that there was a crucial need for a place to think critically about their reality. These individuals, propelled by deeply felt intellectual concerns, and compelled by a strong desire for change, set about conceptualizing an institution which would provide a forum for free and critical thinking about contemporary issues affecting their people, through a process that is, scholarly, analytical and objective. Among its primary goals would be for them to express their history in their own voice and define themselves (and not let others define them).

In 1982, the Zoryan Institute for Contemporary Armenian Research and Documentation was established in Cambridge, Massachusetts. The co-founding members were Garbis Kortian, Gerard Libaridian, and K.M Greg Sarkissian. They were joined by Tatul Sonentz-Papazian and Levon Sarkissian to incorporate the institute as a registered non-for profit (501(c)3).

In 1984, The Zoryan Institute of Canada, Inc., was established by co-founders Varouj Aivazian, Gerard J. Libaridian, and K.M. Greg Sarkissian. They were joined by Albert Bakos and Zaven Sarkissian to incorporate the institute as a registered charity.

Zoryan also had offices in Los Angeles and Paris in the 1980s and 1990s.

The Zoryan Institute has two official divisions: The International Institute for Genocide and Human Rights Studies and the International Institute for Diaspora Studies.

The Zoryan Institute houses a large quantity of reference and archival material, including monographs, periodicals, microfilm, photographs, memoirs, personal correspondence, official documents, etc. In 1983 it launched a project to record oral histories of Armenians who survived the genocide, eventually interviewing more than 800 survivors.

References

External links 
Official website

Non-profit corporations
Armenian-American culture in Massachusetts
Armenian-Canadian culture
Genocide research and prevention organisations
Diaspora organizations in Canada
Diaspora organizations in the United States
Research institutes established in 1982
1982 establishments in Massachusetts
Organizations based in Cambridge, Massachusetts
Human rights organizations based in the United States
Human rights organizations based in Canada